Our Problem is an album by British metal band Iron Monkey released in 1998. The album caused controversy, mainly due to its artwork, which was produced by underground cartoonist Mike Diana. Extreme music magazine, Terrorizer, included the album at number 7 in its list of the top 20 Sludge Metal albums, published in issues 187-188.

Track listing

References

1998 albums
Iron Monkey (band) albums
Earache Records albums
Albums produced by Andy Sneap